The 1967 New Brunswick electoral redistribution was the first redistribution of electoral district boundaries in the New Brunswick, Canada, since 1926, and the first change in number of members since 1946.

At the time, New Brunswick operated on electoral districts with fixed boundaries, and the number of members to which they were entitled varied based upon their respective population. From 1926 to 1967, each of the province's 15 counties was a district. The cities of Saint John and Moncton were districts in their own rights.  These districts elected members using the bloc voting system.

Under this redistribution, all six of New Brunswick's cities became electoral districts, and Saint John County was split into two districts, creating a total of 22 ridings.  For the first time since 1946, this created several districts that returned only one member using the first past the post system.

Electoral districts
Albert: Albert County; two members
Bathurst: City of Bathurst; one member
Campbellton: City of Campbellton, Village of Atholville and the Village of Tide Head; one member
Carleton: Carleton County; three members
Charlotte: Charlotte County; four members
Edmundston: City of Edmundston; one member
Fredericton: City of Fredericton; two members
Gloucester: Gloucester County less the City of Bathurst; five members
Kent: Kent County; three members
Kings: Kings County; three members
Madawaska: Madawaska County less the City of Edmundston; three members
Moncton: City of Moncton; three members
Northumberland: Northumberland County; five members
Queens: Queens County; two members
Restigouche: Restigouche County less the riding of Campbellton; three members
Saint John Centre: City of Saint John; four members
Saint John East: Saint John County east of the Saint John River and outside of the City of Saint John; two members
Saint John West: Saint John County west of the Saint John River and outside of the City of Saint John; one member
Sunbury: Sunbury County; two members
Victoria: Victoria County; two members
Westmorland: Westmorland County less the City of Moncton; four members
York: York County less the City of Fredericton; two members

Politics of New Brunswick
Electoral redistributions in Canada
New Brunswick Legislature
1967 in Canadian politics
1967 in New Brunswick
1967 in politics